DXSM (774 AM) Radyo Pilipinas  is a radio station owned and operated by Philippine Broadcasting Service. The station's studio is located in Camp Asturias, Brgy. Asturias, Jolo, Sulu.

References

Philippine Broadcasting Service
Radio stations in Sulu